Patagonia, Inc. is an American retailer of outdoor clothing. It was founded by Yvon Chouinard in 1973 and is based in Ventura, California. Patagonia operates stores in 10+ countries globally, as well as factories in 16 countries.

History

Yvon Chouinard, an accomplished rock climber, began selling hand-forged mountain climbing gear in 1957 through his company Chouinard Equipment. He worked alone selling his gear until 1965, when he partnered with Tom Frost in order to improve his products and address the growing supply and demand issue he faced.

In 1970, Chouinard obtained rugby shirts from Scotland that he wore while climbing because the collar kept the climbing sling from hurting his neck.

Great Pacific Iron Works, Patagonia's first store, opened in 1973 in the former Hobson meat-packing plant at Santa Clara St. in Ventura, near Chouinard's blacksmith shop. In 1981, Patagonia and Chouinard Equipment were incorporated within Great Pacific Iron Works. In 1984, Chouinard changed the name of Great Pacific Iron Works to Lost Arrow Corporation.

Patagonia has expanded its product line to include apparel targeted towards other sports, such as surfing. In addition to clothing, they offer other related products, including camping food. By the late 2010s, branded Patagonia fleece vests became known for their use by financial executives, and in 2019, Patagonia announced that its distribution of branded products would focus on firms committed to Environmental, social, and corporate governance initiatives.

In September 2020, Patagonia announced that Rose Marcario would step down as its chief executive officer and be succeeded by Ryan Gellert.

In September 2022, Chouinard transferred ownership of Patagonia to the Patagonia Purpose Trust, a trust overseen by the Chouinard family and advisors. Chouinard's stated goal was for profits to be used to address climate change and protect land. The move allows Chouinard to avoid taxes by gifting his shares to a nonprofit holding company, while effectively maintaining control of the company.

Manufacturing

In 2007 and 2011, internal audits revealed that factories in Patagonia's production supply chain were involved in human trafficking, leading to company efforts to address the labor abuses.

In December 2021, the European Center for Constitutional and Human Rights filed a criminal complaint in a Dutch court against Patagonia and other brands, alleging that they benefited from the use of forced Uyghur labor in Xinjiang.

In June 2016, Patagonia released a set of principles for the treatment of animals used to manufacture wool garments, as well as land-use practices and sustainability.

In April 2017, Patagonia announced that merchandise in good condition can be returned for new merchandise credits. The used merchandise is cleaned, repaired and sold on its "Worn Wear" website. In 2019, it launched a program named ReCrafted that creates and sells clothing made from scraps of fabric coming from used Patagonia gear.

As of 2019, the firm aims to become carbon neutral by 2025. Patagonia uses a circular economy strategy in their product design, In 2021, Patagonia announced that it would no longer produce its clothing with added corporate logos to improve garment life-spans.

Activism

Patagonia commits 1% of its total sales to environmental groups, since 1985 through One Percent for the Planet, an organization of which Yvon Chouinard was a founding member. In 2015, the firm launched Common Threads Partnership, an online auction-style platform that facilitated direct sales of used Patagonia clothing. In 2016, Patagonia pledged to contribute 100% of sales from Black Friday to environmental organizations, totaling $10 million. In June 2018, the company announced that it would donate the $10 million it received from President Trump's 2017 tax cuts to "groups committed to protecting air, land and water and finding solutions to the climate crisis."

In February 2017, Patagonia led a boycott of the Outdoor Retailer trade show, which traditionally took place in Salt Lake City, Utah, because of the Utah state legislature's introduction of legislation that would transfer federal lands to the state. Patagonia also opposed Utah Governor Gary Herbert's request that the Trump administration revoke the recently designated Bears Ears National Monument in southern Utah. After several companies joined the Patagonia-led boycott, event organizer Emerald Expositions said it would not accept a proposal from Utah to continue hosting the Outdoor Retailer trade show and would instead move the event to another state.

On December 6, 2017, Patagonia sued the United States Government and President Donald Trump for his proclamations of reducing the protected land of Bears Ears National Monument by 85% and the Grand Staircase–Escalante National Monument by almost 50%. Patagonia sued over the interpretation of the Property Clause of the U.S. Constitution in which the country vests Congress with the power to manage federal lands. The company's then-CEO, Rose Marcario, contends that when Congress passed the Antiquities Act of 1906, it did not give any president the power to reverse a prior president's monument designations.

In July 2020, Patagonia suspended its advertising on Facebook and Facebook's photo-sharing app, Instagram, as part of the "Stop Hate for Profit" campaign, which some U.S. civil rights organizations launched because they believed the social networking company was doing too little to curb hate speech on its sites.

On April 5, 2021, Patagonia pledged $1 million to the activist groups Black Voters Matter and the New Georgia Project, regarding voter registration laws in Georgia.

References

External links

1973 establishments in California
American companies established in 1973
Clothing brands of the United States
Clothing companies established in 1973
Climbing and mountaineering equipment companies
Companies based in Ventura County, California
Outdoor clothing brands
Public benefit corporations based in California
Shoe companies of the United States
Sportswear brands
Surfwear brands
Swimwear brands
B Lab-certified corporations